Askam (officially, Askam Kamyon Imalat ve Ticaret AŞ) was a Turkish automotive manufacturer of trucks and commercial vehicles. The company was established as a  joint venture with US-based Chrysler under the name of Chrysler Sanayii A.Ş., commercialising its products under the Chrysler, Dodge, Fargo and DeSoto brands. Askam was the largest truck manufacturer in Turkey.

The company, which was also the first truck maker in Turkey, ceased production in 2011.

History 
Askam was founded in 1962 as a joint venture with 60% ownership by Chrysler, the company originally traded under the "Chrysler Sanayi A.Ş." name. Production of trucks started in 1964 under the Chrysler, Fargo, Desoto, and Dodge brand names. Most of the models built utilized a cab and front end developed by Chrysler specifically for manufacture in developing countries. This cab, in modified form, continued to be used by Askam until its bankruptcy.

In 1978, Chrysler sold its share to the local partners and then owners, Tatko, Çiftçiler & Ruşensad. Askam continued production under the_Chrysler's license agreement. Most of Askam's products used Perkins diesel engines.

After an agreement signed with Japanese Hino Motors in 1991, Askam started production of mini trucks branded "Hino". When Daimler-Benz and Chrysler merged operations in 1998, Askam changed its name to "Askam Kamyon Imalat ve Ticaret AŞ" in 2002 and continued to produce its products under the Fargo and Desoto brands. 

Askam produced a variety of Fargo and Desoto heavy and light trucks of its own designs. The numerical portion of the model names (AS250, AS700, AS950) stand for the payload in metric tonnes (e.g. 2.5, 7.0, and 9.5 tonnes). In 2003, Çiftçiler Holding became the only owner of the company after acquiring Tatko and Ruşensad shares.

The last trucks were produced in 2011, and attempts were made to sell or revive the company. While trying to buy Askam from Renault Trucks and Temsa, cooperation with the Chinese truck manufacturer SinoTruk came to the fore-front; however, none of the opportunities materialized. Askam filed bankruptcy in 2015.

Products

Trucks

 Hi-Ex
 8 Litre
 AS 700 (DeSoto, Dodge, Fargo)
 AS 950 (DeSoto, Fargo)

Light commercial
 Fargo Fora
 AS 250 (DeSoto, Dodge, Fargo)
 AS 250D

Other
 AS 250 Safari

See also  
 List of companies of Turkey

References

External links 

 
 Fargo Fora (archived, 23 Jul 2010)

Truck manufacturers of Turkey
Vehicle manufacturing companies established in 1964
Manufacturing companies based in Istanbul
Turkish companies established in 1964